Vicki Wilson, OAM, (born 11 February 1965 in Brisbane, Queensland) is an Australian netball coach and retired international player. She is the current head coach of the Netball Fiji side.

Netball career
Wilson was a part of the Australian national netball team for fifteen years, making her debut in 1985. Wilson became captain of the Australian netball team in 1996, while on the comeback trail from a knee injury sustained at the 1995 Netball World Championships. In 1998 she captained Australia to the first ever netball gold medal at the Commonwealth Games and in 1999 she retired on a winning note, after leading Australia to a one-point win in the World Championship final.

Wilson was called up to coach the Queensland Firebirds in 2006, after consistent lacklustre performances in the Commonwealth Bank Trophy. She continued with the franchise in the ANZ Championship, but was stood down from the position by Netball Queensland after the 2009 season.

In May 2013, Wilson was named as the new assistant coach for the New Zealand Silver Ferns until the end of 2015.

In June 2016, she signed to coach the Fiji national netball team side for three years.

Awards
Wilson received the Order of Australia medal in 1992. In 2001, she was inducted into the Australian Institute of Sport 'Best of the Best'.<ref>Australian Institute of Sport 'Best of the Best'  </</ref>  She was inducted into the Sport Australia Hall of Fame in 2004, and the Australian Netball Hall of Fame in November 2008.

References

1965 births
Living people
Australian netball coaches
Recipients of the Medal of the Order of Australia
Sport Australia Hall of Fame inductees
Commonwealth Games gold medallists for Australia
Netball players at the 1998 Commonwealth Games
Australian Institute of Sport netball players
Queensland University of Technology alumni
Commonwealth Games medallists in netball
Australia international netball players
Netball players at the 1989 World Games
Netball players at the 1993 World Games
Netball players at the 1985 World Games
Netball players from Queensland
Queensland Firebirds players
Commonwealth Bank Trophy players
Commonwealth Bank Trophy coaches
Queensland Firebirds coaches
ANZ Championship coaches
Contax Netball Club players
Esso/Mobil Superleague players
1987 World Netball Championships players
1991 World Netball Championships players
1995 World Netball Championships players
1999 World Netball Championships players
Australian expatriate netball people in New Zealand
Central Pulse coaches
Medallists at the 1998 Commonwealth Games